BGC3 can refer to

 Gates Ventures, a company owned by Bill Gates and formerly named bgC3
 Bad Girls Club (season 3)